This is a list of the National Register of Historic Places listings in Van Zandt County, Texas.

This is intended to be a complete list of properties listed on the National Register of Historic Places in Van Zandt County, Texas. There are two properties listed on the National Register in the county. Both properties are also Recorded Texas Historic Landmarks.

Current listings

The locations of National Register properties may be seen in a mapping service provided.

|}

See also

National Register of Historic Places listings in Texas
Recorded Texas Historic Landmarks in Van Zandt County

References

External links

Van Zandt County, Texas
Van Zandt County
Buildings and structures in Van Zandt County, Texas